James Basil Wilkie Roberton (1896–1996) was a New Zealand soldier, medical doctor, historian and writer. He was born in Auckland, New Zealand in 1896.

References

1896 births
1996 deaths
New Zealand writers